Pandipalamavikadu is a village in the Orathanadu taluk of Thanjavur district, Tamil Nadu, India.

Demographics 

As per the 2001 census, Pandipalamavikadu had a total population of 1385 with 682 males and 503 females. The sex ratio was 1031. The literacy rate was 61.53.

References 

 

Villages in Thanjavur district